Othniel  is the name of the first of the Biblical Judges. It can also be a given name.

It may refer to:

People 
 Othniel Looker (1757–1845), American politician from Ohio and member of the Democratic-Republican Party. Briefly fifth Governor of Ohio
 Othniel Charles Marsh (1831–1899), American paleontologist

See also 

 Othniel Looker House, registered historic building in Harrison, Ohio